Vikrant Auti (born 7 June 1994) is an Indian cricketer. He made his first-class debut for Mumbai in the 2018–19 Ranji Trophy on 14 December 2018.

References

External links
 

1994 births
Living people
Indian cricketers
Mumbai cricketers
Place of birth missing (living people)